Kaufman Bros. (KBRO) was an investment banking firm focused on the technology, media, and telecommunications and health-care sectors. KBRO's businesses included securities underwriting, sales and trading, investment banking, financial advisory services, investment research, and venture capital. Founded in 1995, it came to prominence in the late 1990s as a strong boutique player in the telecommunications space. In 1997, Crain's New York Business listed co-founder Craig D. Kaufman in its "40 Under 40" list.  Research analyst Vik Grover in the wireline and wireless communications services space was ranked in The Wall Street Journals "Best on the Street" poll in 2000 and 2001, and was a top 10 most-read analyst in North America on First Call Research Direct in 2001 and first quarter 2002. It closed its doors January 30, 2012.

References

Former investment banks of the United States
Defunct financial services companies of the United States